Speedlite may refer to:

 Canon Speedlite, a Canon brand of electronic flashes for their EOS camera system
 Ricoh Speedlite, a Ricoh brand of electronic flashes

See also 
 Nikon Speedlight, a Nikon brand of electronic flashes for their camera system